The Women's 100m T37 had its first round held on September 11, at 17:05, and the final was held on September 12 at 10:04.

Medalists

Results

References
Round 1 - Heat 1
Round 1 - Heat 2
Final

Athletics at the 2008 Summer Paralympics
2008 in women's athletics